Lukas Konstantin Schneller (born 26 October 2001) is a German professional footballer who plays as a goalkeeper for German club Bayern Munich II.

Career
Schneller made his professional debut for Bayern Munich II in the 3. Liga on 28 November 2020, starting in the away match against Hansa Rostock, which finished as a 0–2 loss.

Career statistics

Honours

Club
Bayern Munich
 FIFA Club World Cup: 2020

References

External links
 
 
 
 
 

2001 births
Living people
German footballers
Association football goalkeepers
FC Bayern Munich II players
3. Liga players